The 2013–14 New York Islanders season was the 42nd season in the franchise's history. The Islanders finished last in the Metropolitan Division and did not qualify for the National Hockey League (NHL) playoffs.

Regular season

Stadium Series 
The Islanders played against their rivals, the New York Rangers, at the 2014 NHL Stadium Series at Yankee Stadium in The Bronx, New York City, on January 29, 2014. The Rangers won the game 2–1.

Standings

Schedule and results

Pre-season

Regular season

Playoffs
The Islanders failed to make the playoffs despite qualifying the previous year in 2012-13.

Injuries

Pre-season

Regular season
Updated as of January 12, 2014

Suspensions/fines

Player statistics
Final stats
Skaters

Goaltenders

†Denotes player spent time with another team before joining the Islanders. Stats reflect time with the Islanders only.
‡Denotes player was traded mid-season. Stats reflect time with the Islanders only.
Bold/italics denotes franchise record.

Transactions
The Islanders have been involved in the following transactions during the 2013–14 season:

Trades

Free agents acquired

Free agents lost

Player signings

Draft picks

New York Islanders' picks at the 2013 NHL Entry Draft, which was held in Newark, New Jersey on June 30, 2013.

Draft notes
 The New York Islanders' second-round pick went to the Anaheim Ducks as the result of a June 22, 2012 trade that sent Lubomir Visnovsky to the Islanders in exchange for this pick.
 The New Jersey Devils' third-round pick went to the New York Islanders (via Minnesota) as a result of a June 30, 2013 trade that sent Nino Niederreiter to the Wild in exchange for Cal Clutterbuck and this pick.

References

External links

New York Islanders seasons
New York Islanders
New York Islanders
New York Islanders
New York Islanders